Hockey Club Sibir Novosibirsk Oblast, also known as HC Sibir or Sibir Novosibirsk, is a Russian professional ice hockey team based in Novosibirsk. They are members of the Chernyshev Division in the Kontinental Hockey League.

History
Ice hockey was introduced to Novosibirsk in 1948 by Ivan Tsyba, who returned from a hockey seminar in Moscow with equipment to play the sport. Immediately popular amongst the populace, the local sports society, Dynamo, decided to establish a hockey team. The first hockey rink was built in autumn 1948 near the Ob River. A second rink was built in February 1949, at the Spartak Stadium. Several teams played in Novosibirsk in this era, the strongest being Dynamo. They were promoted to the Soviet Championship League for the 1954–55 season, finishing in ninth place overall, out of ten teams. They would finish as high as ninth two more times in the Soviet era, in both 1956–57 and 1959–60 (when the league had 16 and 18 teams, respectively). A youth team was formed in 1954, to serve as a development club for the senior team. In its first season of play, it won bronze in the national championship.

In 1962, owing to financial difficulties, Dynamo merged with another team in Novosibirsk, Khimik. Though Dynamo played in the top division, its equipment was of a lesser quality than Khimik, which played in the lowest division and was run by a local chemical factory; the resulting team was renamed Sibir Novosibirsk.

During the first decades of its history, Sibir was subsequently relegated between the elite and second-rate divisions of the Soviet and Russian hockey championships until it finally settled in the Superleague after the 2002–03 season.

After the formation of the Kontinental Hockey League, the team had to change 50% of its roster. Starting with the 2009–10 season, the head coach position was taken by Andrei Tarasenko, a former Novosibirsk forward and a father of the club's young winger Vladimir Tarasenko, who led Sibir to its first Gagarin Cup playoffs in 2011.

Before the 2013–14 season, Sibir changed its full name from Sibir Novosibirsk to Sibir Novosibirsk Oblast.

After the 2022 Russian invasion of Ukraine, Nick Shore and Harri Sateri elected to leave the team.

Season-by-season record

Note: GP = Games played, W = Wins, L = Losses, T = Ties, OTL = Overtime/shootout losses, Pts = Points, GF = Goals for, GA = Goals against

Players

Current roster

Franchise records and leaders

All-time KHL point leaders
'Note: GP = Games played; G = Goals; A = Assists; Pts = Points, PIM = Penalties in minutes, PPG = Powerplay Goals, SHG = Shorthanded Goals, GWG = Game Winning Goals'

Honors

Champions
 Vysshaya Liga (2): 1993, 2002

 Etela-Saimaa Lappeenranta (1): 2012

Runners-up
 Gagarin Cup (1): 2015

References

External links
  

 
Kontinental Hockey League teams
Ice hockey teams in Russia
HC Sibir Novosibirsk